Angadrisma (Angadrême, Angadresima, Angadreme, Angradesma, Andragasyna) (d. ca. 695) was a seventh-century abbess and  saint, daughter of Robert I, Bishop of Tours.  A cousin to Lambert, Bishop of Lyon, she was educated at Thérouanne by Lambert and Saint Audomare (Omer).

Although she wished to become a nun, she was promised in an arranged marriage to Saint Ansbert of Chaussy. Tradition states that Angadrisma, wishing for a way out, prayed fervently and was stricken with leprosy.  She was cured when she was allowed to become a nun and received the veil from Saint Ouen, archbishop of Rouen.

She became abbess of the Benedictine convent of Oroër-des-Vierges, near Beauvais.

Angadrisma is portrayed in art with her face pitted by leprous skin. She is venerated as the patron of the diocese of Beauvais.

References

External links
Ste Angadrême, vierge; Patronne principale de Beauvais  website of Le diocèse de Beauvais, Noyon et Senlis
Saint of the Day, October 14: Angadrisma website of Saint Patrick Catholic Church, Washington, DC
Saint Angadrisma of Beauvais Saints.SQPN.com

7th-century births
690s deaths
Frankish abbesses
7th-century Frankish saints
Christian female saints of the Middle Ages
7th-century Frankish nuns